The National Technology Council (acronym NTC) is an accreditation body under the administrative control of Higher Education Commission. It accredits engineering technology degree programs. and also registers engineering technology graduates across the country.

Registration of engineering technology graduates
The council registers engineering technology graduates in the following two categories

Registration as a graduate engineering technologist
Graduate with 4-year engineering technology degree is registered as a graduate engineering technologist.

Registration as a professional engineering technologist 
Graduate with 4-year engineering technology degree and minimum five years relevant work experience is registered as a professional engineering technologist.

See also 
 National Business Education Accreditation Council
 National Computing Education Accreditation Council

References

External links
NTC official website

Educational organisations based in Pakistan
Higher Education Commission (Pakistan)
Vocational education in Pakistan